Riscos de Momostenango is an area of curiously shaped sandstone formations located in the municipality of Momostenango in Guatemala.

An area of 2.4 km2, including the sandstone formations and the surrounding forests, was declared a national park in 1955.

References

National parks of Guatemala
Protected areas established in 1955
1955 establishments in Guatemala